Parisapparambil Kunjan Pillai Ramachandran Pillai is an Indian film producer, distributor, businessman, and actor, who worked in Malayalam film industry. Founder of film production company Shirdi Sai Creations and distributed films through Shirdi Sai Release. He is credited with producing eight of Mohanlal's films in the 1980s, best known for producing Chithram. He has produced 22 films.

Biography
Pillai hails from Koothattukulam, Kerala. He began importing business in Bombay in his early years itself. It rose to become a large company called Starnight Group of Industries. He was also active in politics and was a member of the Indian National Congress. He maintained close friendship with prime minister-stateswoman Indira Gandhi. He was an ardent devotee of Shirdi Sai Baba and had built a temple and an eponymous auditorium near his house in Koothattukulam. He had a 26 horses racecourse. His first marriage was with Sarojam, who died in an accident. He has four children (Rajesh, Preethi, Saju, Sidhu) with his second wife Rama. His son Sidhu, an actor, died in 2018. Pillai's debut production was Vepraalam in 1984, in which he also played an important role. He also acted in his second film Thathamme Poocha Poocha (1984).

Filmography

Production
Vepraalam (1984)
Thathamme Poocha Poocha (1984)
Ezhu Muthal Onpathu Vare (1985)
Puli Varunne Puli (1985)
Onathumbikkoru Oonjaal (1985)
Oru Yugasandhya (1986)
Shobhraj (1986)
Amrutham Gamaya (1987)
Chithram (1988)
Vandanam (1989)
Arhatha (1990)
Kizhakkunarum Pakshi (1991)
Aham 
Rapid Action Force (2000)
Oomappenninu Uriyadappayyan (2002)
Pranayamanithooval (2002)

Distribution
Ezhu Muthal Onpathu Vare (1985)
Ayanum (1985)
Jaalakam (1987)
Vellanakalude Nadu (1988)
Aey Auto (1990)
Vishnulokam (1991)
Ennum Sambhavami Yuge Yuge (2001)
Achanurangatha Veedu (2006)

References

External links
 

Year of birth missing (living people)
Place of birth missing (living people)
Living people
Malayalam film producers